The Duncan Banner "Stephens County's Only Daily Newspaper", is a five-day (Tuesday through Saturday) daily newspaper published in Duncan, Oklahoma, United States.  Founded by James P. Sampson in 1892, The Duncan Banner is the oldest business in Duncan still operating under the same name. Its first presses were reportedly brought to Duncan on the first railroad train to stop there. The newspaper is owned by Community Newspaper Holdings Inc. The newspaper is published in the morning on Tuesday, Wednesday, Thursday, Friday and Saturday and has a circulation of 5,000.

References

External links
 The Duncan Banner Website
 CNHI Website

Newspapers published in Oklahoma
Stephens County, Oklahoma